Gun Fury is a 1953 3-D American Western crime film directed by Raoul Walsh and starring Rock Hudson and Donna Reed, with major supporting roles for Philip Carey and Leo Gordon. The film is based on the novel Ten Against Caesar by Kathleen B. George and Robert A. Granger. The supporting cast includes Lee Marvin and Neville Brand. It was filmed in the Red Rocks area of Sedona, Arizona.

Plot
After a stagecoach holdup, Frank Slayton's notorious gang leave Ben Warren for dead and head off with his fiancée. Warren follows, and although none of the townspeople he comes across are prepared to help, he manages to recruit two men who have sworn revenge on the ruthless Slayton.

One is Jess Burgess,  gang member who had objected to the kidnapping and was abandoned to die in the desert.
The other is Johash, an Indian with an equally personal grudge---his sister was abducted and murdered by Slayton under identical circumstances.

As the pursuit continues, "Southern Gentleman" Slayton kills  three members of his gang for real and/or imagined offenses.

Just short of the Mexican border, his gang is forced to take shelter in a ghost town. Johash's deadly skill with a sniper rifle cuts off the gang's escape route, as three more gang members fatally discover.

Warren places the only available water in an open space and challenges Slayton to come and get it. Slayton is out of ammunition, and Warren eventually wins a lengthy fistfight that begins at the top of a steep hill and slowly and dangerously progresses to ground level.

Warren's experiences during the Civil War had made him basically a pacifist. But thanks to Johash, he is able to keep his own hands basically clean; and he and fiance Jennifer Ballard are re-united.

Cast
 Rock Hudson as Ben Warren
 Donna Reed as Jennifer Ballard
 Philip Carey as Frank Slayton
 Roberta Haynes as Estella Morales
 Leo Gordon as Jess Burgess
 Lee Marvin as Blinky
 Neville Brand as Brazos
 Ray Thomas as Doc
 Bob Herron as Curly Jordan (as Robert Herron)
 Phil Rawlins as Jim Morse
 Forrest Lewis as Weatherby
 Pat Hogan as Johash

References

External links

1953 films
1953 3D films
American 3D films
1953 Western (genre) films
American Western (genre) films
Films shot in Arizona
Films directed by Raoul Walsh
Columbia Pictures films
1950s English-language films
1950s American films